The Ultimate Fighter is an American reality television series and mixed martial arts (MMA) competition produced by the Ultimate Fighting Championship (UFC)  and Pilgrim Media Group currently airing on ESPN+. It previously aired for fourteen seasons on Spike TV. The show features professional MMA fighters living together in Las Vegas, Nevada, and follows them as they train and compete against each other for a prized six-figure contract with the UFC. The series debuted on January 17, 2005, with its first episode, "The Quest Begins". To date, there have been thirty seasons of the show, two per calendar year. Each season features either one or two weight classes in the tournament.

The historic Forrest Griffin vs. Stephan Bonnar fight in the first season drew millions of viewers to the show and launched the sport into the mainstream.  Because of this success, The Ultimate Fighter was regarded as instrumental to the survival and expansion of the UFC and mixed martial arts into the mainstream. Many current and past UFC fighters are alumni of the show, with some competitors going on to become coaches in future seasons. The show has undergone multiple format changes since its inception, including the introduction of the wildcard bout. Many winners have gone on to compete for UFC championships with some becoming UFC champions.

History
The Ultimate Fighter was originally an experimental series financed by the former owners of the Ultimate Fighting Championship (UFC), Lorenzo and Frank Fertitta III. The series was aired on Spike TV as a last resort measure to gain mainstream exposure for mixed martial arts (MMA).

During the early days of Spike TV, the channel wanted sports programming, but had no budget for sports licensing fees. Spike TV founder Albie Hecht began a search to find programming with broad appeal that the network could afford. In the end, Spike narrowed its choices down to the UFC and K-1. Hecht flew to Japan to meet with the head of K-1, but the meeting did not go well. Weeks later, Hecht met with Lorenzo Fertitta in Las Vegas. Hecht was impressed by the UFC's celebrity following, its plan to acquire and consolidate smaller promotions into the UFC, and with Dana White's ability to be a "Vince McMahon"-like personality.

Hecht saw K-1 as a safer bet, given it had more international notoriety. He was also not a fan of the grappling aspects of MMA, but the UFC rebuffed his suggestion to change the rules of the sport to accommodate striking. Hecht credits Kevin Kay and his editorial collaboration with the UFC for highlighting the show's story lines, which he believes helped drive its ratings success.

Airing after World Wrestling Entertainment's flagship show WWE Raw, The Ultimate Fighter's debut episode was able to garner a 57% retention rate in viewers from Raw, which was double the usual rate for Spike TV. It is believed by some that WWE's Vince McMahon had to approve The Ultimate Fighter following Raw, but this is incorrect. According to Hecht, McMahon did not have the final say, but given his stature and Raw's importance to Spike TV at the time, the network wanted McMahon to "be on board" with the program lineup. At the time, Hecht believes the WWE did not see the UFC as a challenge.

The live finale for the first season saw the historic bout of Forrest Griffin vs. Stephan Bonnar. Now widely regarded as the most influential fight in MMA history, the bout took place in what was the first ever MMA event on live and free television. The bout ended in a unanimous decision victory for Griffin and led to the show's renewal on Spike TV. Regarding the success of the show, UFC president Dana White said, "It's amazing to think.... how close we came to not being here today. If it weren't for what these guys did, I don't know if there would even be a UFC. I'll never forget these guys. Ever."

The renewal of the show saw UFC produce two more series, before subsequent renewals. In order to garner more attention for the sport, The Ultimate Fighter  utilizes gimmicks: one notable example, in the ninth season, employed a country vs. country theme, with the United States competing against the United Kingdom. These gimmicks enabled the UFC to appeal to fans that had been recently introduced to the sport during UFCs penetration into the European market. The Ultimate Fighter also drew record viewing figures for Spike TV when YouTube sensation Kimbo Slice participated in the tenth season. Slice's fight against veteran Roy Nelson attracted viewers to the sport, drawing an audience of 6.1 million, making it one of the most viewed MMA fights in history.

As part of a new broadcasting relationship between the UFC and Fox Sports, The Ultimate Fighter moved to FX beginning in season 15. Season 14 was the final season of the series to air on Spike, who considered the relationship to be "incredibly beneficial in building both our brands.” In September 2013, the series moved to Fox's new mainstream sports network Fox Sports 1.

Because of the need to keep the fight results secret until the airing of the episode, each fight on The Ultimate Fighter is officially an "exhibition", and as such does not count towards the fighters overall record. 

Selection process

Seasons 1–4

For the first four seasons, prospective UFC fighters from two different weight classes were selected to compete. The fighters are divided into two teams, irrespective of weight class, with each team coached by a current UFC headliner. The teams then compete (in a manner which varies by season), with the loser being eliminated from the competition. Often, incentives are provided for the team of a winning fighter. This can include the right for their team to select the next matchup, in order to pick off fighters from the opposing team by selecting favourable matchups.

At the end of a season, the two remaining fighters of each weight class are placed in a single-elimination fight at Ultimate Fighter Finales, such as The Ultimate Fighter 1 Finale  where the title of Ultimate Fighter is awarded to the winner. Seasons five to seven and ten to twelve have featured fighters from just one weight class each, with the other seasons focusing on two weight classes.

The show features the daily preparations each fighter makes to train for competition at the UFC training center, and the interactions they have with each other living under the same roof. Day-to-day events on the show are overseen by UFC president Dana White.

With the exception of the season finales, fights on The Ultimate Fighter are sanctioned by the Nevada Athletic Commission as exhibition matches and do not count for or against a fighter's professional record. This is done to keep the results from going public before the air date. However, going into the semi-final stage of each series, fights are scheduled for the full professional three rounds, as opposed to two rounds (with the possibility of a sudden victory round) for all stages prior. Though officially exhibition fights, the UFC chooses to record the results of semi-final matchups. For example, the seventh season winner Amir Sadollah has one more win on his UFC record than on his official record due to his victory in his season's semi-final round.

Changes
The first six seasons featured sixteen fighters, in either one or two weight categories. The first two seasons, however, were very different from each following season. The original format for The Ultimate Fighter saw each team compete in challenges, such as hoisting their respective coach up on their shoulders and sprinting down a beach, or a team tug-of-war. These challenges resulted in eliminations of fighters who hadn't fought, until late in the season when the challenge incentive was to select the next fight where fighters would be eliminated, having lost the fight. In the first two seasons, fighters would also leave the house for good upon losing and this often resulted in odd numbers for teams, which forced the moving of fighters to opposing teams.

Beginning in season four, fighters were no longer removed from the house after losing their fights and did not switch teams except in extraordinary cases, such as being kicked off a team by the head coach.  In the seventh season, instead of the usual sixteen fighters, thirty-two fighters participated. This new rule introduced a preliminary fight, in order to get into the house, which gave the coaches an early evaluation.

The final change to date was the introduction of the "wild card" for seasons 11-13. In seasons 11 & 12, 28 fighters competed in the preliminary round, with the winning fourteen entering the house. A "wild card" bout would take place at the end of the "round-of-fourteen" featuring two of the losing fighters. The winner of the wild card bout would then be included in the quarterfinal round of eight fighters. This format proved highly successful for middleweight fighter Kris McCray, who took part in season 11's wild card bout. Having lost his opening match in the house, he won the wild card bout to reach the quarter finals and went on to win his next two bouts, reaching the tournament final. The wild card bout was instituted one last time in season 13, which only featured 14 fighters in the house & no preliminary fights.

Contract award
The winners of the first three seasons of The Ultimate Fighter competition, and certain runners-up depending on their performance in their competition finals, receive the touted "six-figure" contract to fight in the UFC. These contracts are specifically three-year contracts with a guaranteed first year.  Each year consists of three fights, the first year's purse per fight consists of $12,000 guaranteed with a $12,000 win bonus (a maximum of $24,000 per fight). The second year's purse per fight is $16,000 with a $16,000 win bonus (a maximum of $32,000 per fight) and the third year's purse per fight is at $22,000 with a $22,000 win bonus (a maximum of $44,000 per fight).

A TUF winner who goes 9–0 can earn $300,000 total on the contract, but only $150,000 is guaranteed for all three years if nine fights are fought. Some TUF competitors who did not win the series were also offered UFC contracts, although not on as attractive terms.

Coaches involvement

With the exception of seasons 2, 4, 11, 13, 15, 16, 22 and season 1 of TUF: Brazil the coaches fought each other after the conclusion of the show. Season 2 featured Rich Franklin and Matt Hughes, who were in different weight categories, eliminating the possibility for a post-season fight. Season 4 saw multiple guest coaches take the lead, differing from other seasons with two clearly designated coaches. Season 22 did not feature a fight between coaches Conor McGregor and Urijah Faber since McGregor was the UFC Interim Featherweight Champion and had an automatic title unification with Featherweight Champion José Aldo next.  As such, these seasons did not feature their respective coaches in competition. Season 11 coaches Tito Ortiz and Chuck Liddell's fight was cancelled due to Ortiz's need for neck fusion surgery. Season 13 saw the fight between Brock Lesnar and Junior dos Santos cancelled after Lesnar was diagnosed with his second bout of diverticulitis. 2012 saw the cancellation of a bout between season 15 coaches Dominick Cruz and Urijah Faber, due to a torn ACL for Cruz. In addition, the expected fight between the TUF: Brazil coaches Vitor Belfort and Wanderlei Silva did not occur after Belfort sustained a broken hand while preparing for the fight. Season 16 was supposed to feature a fight between coaches Roy Nelson and Shane Carwin, though this was also cancelled after Carwin suffered a knee injury.

In addition to the seasons which did not feature post-season fights between the coaches, several seasons have been impacted, forcing postponements. Due to injuries to the season six coaches Matt Serra and Matt Hughes, their fight was postponed. Serra suffered a herniated disc in his lower back and Hughes later suffered a torn MCL before the fight finally took place at UFC 98. The fight between season ten coaches Rashad Evans and Quinton Jackson took place at UFC 114 with Rashad Evans winning by unanimous decision. The fight was postponed by five months due to Jackson's A-Team filming commitments and his temporary decision to retire from fighting.

Though rarely taking place at the live finales, the coaches' fights are an important part of each season of The Ultimate Fighter. With each season effectively hyping the fight and the individuals for multiple weeks, the fights are usually the focal point of the pay-per-view event in which they are featured. The coaches' fights have resulted in the following matchups and results:

Season synopsesSeason 1–3The first season of The Ultimate Fighter was the last attempt by the UFC to capture public interest in the sport. The Stephan Bonnar and Forrest Griffin bout saved the sport according to many journalists and Dana White. Despite his loss, Bonnar was also awarded a coveted contract live on the air, after White declared that "There were no losers in this fight." Griffin and Diego Sanchez are also regarded as the original Ultimate Fighters, after their wins at the finale.

The second season saw welterweights and heavyweights compete, featuring coaches Rich Franklin and Matt Hughes. The final saw Rashad Evans defeating Brad Imes and Joe Stevenson defeating Luke Cummo.

The third season highlighted the long-standing rivalry between Tito Ortiz and Ken Shamrock. It was also the first season to feature competitors from outside of North America, after the addition of Michael Bisping and Ross Pointon. The season saw a format change, when the team-games were eliminated in favour of a conventional knockout style tournament format. The final fights saw Michael Bisping become the first non-American winner, defeating Josh Haynes and Kendall Grove defeat Ed Herman.Season 4–7The fourth season was different from others before it, as it was the "comeback" season. Past UFC fighters who hadn't had the success they were expected to have, were invited back, to compete in the show, with the winner receiving a guaranteed title shot. This season was also the only one to date to not feature team coaches. Instead, the show had guest coaches each week. The final saw Matt Serra defeat Chris Lytle and Travis Lutter defeat Patrick Côté to receive their guaranteed title shots.

The fifth season was coached by Jens Pulver and B.J. Penn, as the company attempted to kickstart the lightweight division. The show featured many of the future stars of the lightweight division such as Nate Diaz, Joe Lauzon, Gray Maynard, Matt Wiman and Cole Miller. Despite the fact that Team Pulver won 5 out of the first eight fights, the 3 fighters who made it through the quarterfinals on Team Penn are still in the UFC which are Gray Maynard, Matt Wiman and Joe Lauzon while Cole Miller, Manvel Gamburyan, and Nate Diaz from Team Pulver are still in the UFC. The final was contested by Nate Diaz and Manvel Gamburyan, with Gamburyan falling to a shoulder injury early on.

Former winner Matt Serra returned to the show in the sixth season to coach alongside Matt Hughes and oversaw a group of welterweight fighters. The final saw veteran Mac Danzig defeat Tommy Speer to become The Ultimate Fighter, before he dropped to the lightweight division. Arguably, only George Sotiropoulos has gone on to have any success post-TUF, having gone on a 7 fight win streak after The Ultimate Fighter, while season winner Danzig has hovered around the .500 mark since his season win.

The seventh season saw another format change, as fighters had to compete to be official castmembers. Instead of the usual 16 fighters, the season had 32 fighters after Dana White claimed that he was tired of fighters coming onto the show for airtime. This season was coached by UFC Light Heavyweight champion Quinton Jackson and challenger Forrest Griffin, the first season's winner. The season's final was due to be competed between Amir Sadollah, who hadn't competed in a professional fight before the show, and Jesse Taylor. However, Taylor was kicked off the show after filming had completed, when he kicked the window out of a limosine in Las Vegas. His slot was taken by C.B. Dollaway who defeated Tim Credeur for the right, but Sadollah won in the final to become The Ultimate Fighter.Season 8–12The eighth season was coached by UFC Interim Heavyweight champion Antônio Rodrigo Nogueira and Frank Mir, with lightweights and light heavyweights being the focus for the season. The show was largely dominated by the actions of Junie Browning, who would regularly get drunk and act in an aggressive manner towards his fellow castmates. The two fights at the final saw Efrain Escudero defeat Phillipe Nover and Ryan Bader defeat Vinny Magalhães.

The ninth season saw a United States vs. United Kingdom theme for the show, with Dan Henderson and Michael Bisping coaching the respective sides. The two sides contrasted, with the UK side showing close friendship (with many coming from Team Rough House), whilst the US team appeared fractured. The lightweight final saw Team Rough House teammates Andre Winner and Ross Pearson face off for the contract, with Pearson coming out on top via decision. The welterweight final saw James Wilks defeat DaMarques Johnson via submission in the opening round, handing the UK team a 2-0 victory.

The tenth season was the first season to feature only heavyweights and was largely built around the internet sensation Kimbo Slice and former NFL players. The two coaches were former UFC Light Heavyweight champions Quinton Jackson and Rashad Evans who squabbled throughout the entire season, hyping their eventual fight further. However, midway through the airing of the season, it was announced that Jackson was filming The A-Team, as its lead character B. A. Baracus, leading to the postponement of the coaches' fight. The season also featured several former NFL players, with one - Brendan Schaub - making the final of the show. Additionally, the season was occasionally criticised after the cardio of the heavyweights came into question. The final saw MMA veteran Roy Nelson and Brendan Schaub, with Nelson winning via first-round knockout.

The eleventh season saw former UFC Light Heavyweight champions Tito Ortiz and Chuck Liddell coach the two teams. Unlike previous seasons, the number of competitors in the house was reduced to 14, with 7 progressing to the quarter-finals. An eighth was added via a "wildcard" bout - a bout between two losers from the round of 14. The slots went to Kyacey Uscola and Kris McCray, which saw McCray win via submission. McCray would then go on to avenge his earlier defeat, in the semi-finals, defeating Josh Bryant. The season was blighted by injuries to multiple competitors, such as the withdrawal of Nick Ring, after he required knee surgery. After Rich Attonito pulled out of the competition, his quarter final place was taken by Court McGee. Court McGee and Kris McCray met in the final, where McGee would win via submission to become The Ultimate Fighter.

The twelfth season saw the UFC Welterweight champion Georges St-Pierre coach alongside former opponent and number one contender to the title, Josh Koscheck. The season saw the continuation of the wildcard format and 14-man tournament bracket. The show's number one pick was Marc Stevens, who would go on to lose in one of the quickest submissions (via guillotine choke) in the show's history. The wildcard slots went to Marc Stevens and Aaron Wilkinson, with Wilkinson handing Stevens his second successive guillotine choke loss. The show was dominated by Josh Koscheck's attempts to annoy Georges St-Pierre, with St-Pierre's paramedic getting involved in the arguments with Koscheck. The finale was a match between Jonathan Brookins and Michael Johnson on December 4, 2010 which resulted in Brookins winning via unanimous decision.Season 13–16 (and regional versions)'''
The thirteenth season was coached by former UFC Heavyweight champion Brock Lesnar and Junior dos Santos, who would later go on to win the same title. This season featured welterweights and removed the elimination bouts to get into the house, with 14 fighters immediately gaining entry into the house. The first day of training saw Myles Jury pull out of the competition with a knee injury. The wildcard made another appearance, with Javier Torres and Chuck O'Neil getting the slots, leading to a submission victory for O'Neil. The final of this season saw Tony Ferguson defeat Ramsey Nijem via KO in the first round.

The fourteenth season featured bantamweights and featherweights for the first time, with Michael Bisping coaching for the second time, with Jason Miller opposing him. The cast was considered to be one of the most notable in several seasons of the Ultimate Fighter, perhaps owing to this season being the first for the weight classes. Fighters once again had to compete to get into the house, but during the preliminary round, Dana White announced end-of-season bonuses for the best knockout, submission and fight. The awards went to John Dodson, Dennis Bermudez and Dustin Pague vs. Louis Gaudinot respectively. The eventual winners of the season were John Dodson (who defeated T.J. Dillashaw at bantamweight) and Diego Brandao (who defeated Dennis Bermudez at featherweight).

The fifteenth season was the first season to air on FX and moved to a live format. The season was coached by UFC Bantamweight champion Dominick Cruz and Urijah Faber and featured the lightweight division. The entry fights consisted of just one round, as opposed to the usual two with the possibility of a sudden death victory. During the first week in the house, Michael Chiesa - one of the participants - was told that his father had died. Despite this, he was able to continue in the competition and ultimately won after defeating Al Iaquinta at the finale. The live season aired at the same time as TUF Brazil, which was the first regional version of the show. That season was coached by Vitor Belfort and Wanderlei Silva and featured featherweights and middleweights. This season featured a scrambling of the teams, as seven of the Team Vitor fighters had won for only one of the Team Wanderlei fighters.  The finalists for the show were Rony "Jason" Mariano Bezerra and Godofredo Pepey in the featherweight division and Cezar "Mutante" Ferreira and Daniel Sarafian in the middleweight division. However, Sarafian was forced to withdraw from the finale, making him the first and (to-date) only finalist to ever withdraw through injury. He was replaced by Sergio "Serginho" Moraes, the man he had defeated via KO in the semi-final round. The eventual winners were Bezerra and Ferreira, with both winning via decision.

Seasons

Main seasons

A. For this season instead of coaches, prominent trainers and UFC fighters acted as advisors.
B. Tito Ortiz was replaced in the final episode by Rich Franklin.
C. This season is the first to feature a gym vs. gym format as each team is composed of fighters from the same gym and their head coaches are also the teams' head coaches.
D. There was no individual tournament for the season. After a round of 12 fights, divided into points (the first four fights were 25 points, the next 50 and the last were 100 points), American Top Team emerged victorious and won $200,000. Then, each team picked a representative to fight at the finale for $300,000 and the tournament trophy.
E. Sijara Eubanks was scheduled to be part of the finale, but was pulled on the day of the weigh ins due to medical reasons and was replaced by Roxanne Modafferi.

International versions
These versions did not have a stand-alone The Ultimate Fighter final.

F. Daniel Sarafian was scheduled to be part of the finale, but was injured and replaced by Sergio Moraes.
G. Santiago Ponzinibbio was scheduled to be part of the finale, but was injured and replaced by Leonardo Santos.
H. For this season Cung Le served as a mentor and chief coach.
I. Hailin Ao left the show after the 4th episode due to personal reasons. His staff took over his duties.
J. Anderson Silva was removed from the show on episode 3 due to his failed pre-fight drug test for UFC 183. He was replaced by Antônio Rodrigo Nogueira.

Impact

Post-show successThe Ultimate Fighter has created many successful fighters. As of October 2019, ten TUF contestants have won UFC titles. However, some fighters have also had success in the sister promotions World Extreme Cagefighting (WEC) or Strikeforce. The following fighters have competed for a UFC, Strikeforce or WEC championship:

Season 1

Season 2

Season 3

Season 4

As part of season four, Travis Lutter and Matt Serra received automatic and immediate title shots, though non-winners can also compete for titles. Lutter was scheduled to compete for the UFC Middleweight Championship at UFC 67: All Or Nothing, but weighed in over the limit. He still competed against the champion and lost a non-title fight.

Season 5

Season 13

Season 14

Season 15

Season 17

Season 18

Season 20

Season 20 was the first season of The Ultimate Fighter'' to crown a champion. All fighters of the season were competing to win the inaugural UFC Women's Strawweight Championship. Most of the competitors from the division came from TUF 20.

Season 21

Season 24
The winner of Season 24 won a fight with Demetrious Johnson. Tim Elliott won the tournament and fought Johnson for the main event on the finale.

Season 26

All fighters of the season were competing to win the inaugural UFC Women's Flyweight Championship. Most of the competitors from the division came from TUF 26.

The Smashes

Robert Whittaker was scheduled to defend his UFC Middleweight Championship against Yoel Romero at UFC 213: Romero vs. Whittaker. However, Romero weighed in over the limit. Whittaker would go on to win a non-title fight.

Brazil Season 2

Brazil Season 3

Latin America

T.U.F. winners who have fought each other
Many of the TUF winners have gone on to fight each other.
Rashad Evans (season 2 winner) def. Michael Bisping (season 3 winner) - UFC 78
Rashad Evans (season 2 winner) def. Forrest Griffin (season 1 winner) - UFC 92
Diego Sanchez (season 1 winner) def. Joe Stevenson (season 2 winner) - UFC 95
Joe Stevenson (season 2 winner) def. Nate Diaz (season 5 winner) - TUF 9 Finale
Mac Danzig (season 6 winner) def. Joe Stevenson (season 2 winner) - UFC 124
Mac Danzig (season 6 winner) def. Efrain Escudero (season 8 winner) - UFC 145
Robert Whittaker (Smashes winner) def. Colton Smith (season 16 winner) - UFC 160
Court McGee (season 11 winner) def. Robert Whittaker (Smashes winner) - UFC Fight Night: Condit vs. Kampmann 2
Michael Chiesa (season 15 winner) def. Colton Smith (season 16 winner) - UFC: Fight for the Troops 3
Norman Parke (Smashes winner) drew. Leonardo Santos (Brazil 2 winner) - UFC Fight Night: Shogun vs. Henderson 2
Diego Sanchez (season 1 winner) def. Ross Pearson (season 9 winner) - UFC Fight Night: Henderson vs. Khabilov
Leonardo Santos (Brazil 2 winner)  def. Efrain Escudero (season 8 winner) - UFC Fight Night: Bigfoot vs. Arlovski
Antônio Carlos Júnior (Brazil 3 winner) def. Eddie Gordon (season 19 winner) - UFC Fight Night: Machida vs. Romero
Ryan Bader (season 8 winner) def. Rashad Evans (season 2 winner) - UFC 192
Ross Pearson (season 9 winner) def. Chad Laprise (Nations: Canada vs. Australia winner) - UFC Fight Night: Hunt vs. Mir
Kamaru Usman (season 21 winner) def. Warlley Alves (Brazil 3 winner) - UFC Fight Night: Bader vs. Nogueira 2
Elias Theodorou (Nations: Canada vs. Australia winner) def. Cezar Ferreira (Brazil winner) - UFC Fight Night: Lewis vs. Browne
Kelvin Gastelum (season 17 winner) def. Michael Bisping (season 3 winner) - UFC Fight Night: Bisping vs. Gastelum
Tatiana Suarez (season 23 winner) def. Carla Esparza (season 20 winner) - UFC 228
Michael Chiesa (season 15 winner) def. Diego Sanchez (season 1 winner) - UFC 239
Julianna Peña (season 18 winner) def. Nicco Montaño (season 26 winner) - UFC Fight Night: de Randamie vs. Ladd
Robert Whittaker (Smashes winner) def. Kelvin Gastelum (season 17 winner) - UFC on ESPN: Whittaker vs. Gastelum
Nate Diaz (season 5 winner) def. Tony Ferguson (season 13 winner) - UFC 279

See also

The Ultimate Surfer

References

Further reading

External links
Ultimate Fighter Official Site
Spike TV's Ultimate Fighter page

 
2005 American television series debuts
2000s American reality television series
2010s American reality television series
American sports television series
Ultimate Fighting Championship television series
Spike (TV network) original programming
Mixed martial arts mass media
Mixed martial arts television shows